Behind Enemy Lines is a series of war films beginning with Behind Enemy Lines in 2001, followed by films in 2006, 2009 and 2014. All four films feature the United States Navy.

Films

Behind Enemy Lines (2001)

Lieutenant Chris Burnett, an American naval flight officer, is shot down over Bosnia and his co-pilot is killed. He uncovers genocide in the midst of the Bosnian War. Meanwhile, his commanding officer is struggling to gain approval to launch a search and rescue mission to save Burnett.

Behind Enemy Lines II: Axis of Evil (2006)

After reconnaissance satellites detect a large, three-stage Topol intercontinental ballistic missile carrying a nuclear weapon in North Korea, which can strike anywhere in the continental United States, President Adair T. Manning orders a team of U.S. Navy SEALs led by Lieutenant Bobby James to destroy the missile and the launch site.

Behind Enemy Lines: Colombia (2009)

Colombia is in chaos, as a five-man team of US Navy SEALS commanded by Lieutenant Sean Macklin embark on a secret mission to ensure that peace talks between the country's government and insurgent guerrillas don't erupt into violence, an unforeseen complication threatens all out war. Out of nowhere, the meeting falls under attack and the leaders from both sides are killed. The SEALS have been framed for the crime, leaving them to fight for their lives from behind enemy lines against the Colombian Special Forces (AFEUR). Abandoned by their government and left for dead, the weary soldiers race to uncover the evidence that will prove their innocence while ensuring that the violence is contained. Should the fighting spill over the border, the entire region could be plunged into a nightmarish inferno of war and death.

SEAL Team 8: Behind Enemy Lines (2014)

A team of United States Navy SEALs is sent on an unsanctioned mission in Africa to find a secret mining operation and prevent weapons-grade uranium from falling into the hands of terrorists.

Cancelled pilot
On September 15, 2015, Fox announced a television pilot based on the original film with Homeland director Jeffrey Nachmanoff as writer and director of the pilot which would be produced by Davis Entertainment. The pilot will be rewritten by Nikki Toscano. Fox has ordered a pilot directed by McG. On February 13, 2017, B.J. Britt has landed one of the leads in the pilot. On May 23, 2017, Fox passed on the pilot.

Cast and characters

Crew

References

 
Film series introduced in 2001
Action film series
20th Century Studios franchises
American war films
Films about the United States Navy
Tetralogies